Dey Chopan, also spelled as Daichopan, is the northernmost district in Zabul province of Afghanistan. Historically the district belonged to Hazaras, which was occupied by Abdur Rahman Khan in the 19th century. In 2013, it had a population of about 38,300.

The district’s main ethnic groups are the Dai Chopan tribe of Hazaras and the Tokhi tribe of Ghilji Pashtuns.

See also
Districts of Afghanistan
Dai Chopan (Hazara tribe)

References

Districts of Zabul Province